Rubin Dantschotter (born 18 February 1986 in Bruges) is a Belgian professional football player. His position on the field is goalkeeper.

Club career
SV Loppem was Dantschotters first team, where he was discovered by Cercle Brugge at an early age. Dantschotter has played several matches for the Belgian national youth teams. He was the back-up goalie for former Belgian international Franky Vandendriessche. But when Vandendriessche retired in 2007, Dantschotter received the shirt with number 1.

Dantschotter debuted for Cercle in a cup match against AA Gent in December 2005, drawing 1-1 and losing after penalties.

After the departure of Francky Vandendriessche, Dantschotter was supposed to become first choice goalie. But due to personal problems, newly signed Bram Verbist got his chance at the beginning of the season. Dantschotter got to play the last 7 matches, after an injury of Verbist.

Dantschotter was loaned to second division side SK Beveren in 2008-09. He played on loan for KV Oostende from January to June 2011, and was loaned to Sparta Rotterdam in 2011–12.

He later played for amateur sides SV Koekelare and SW Harelbeke.

References

External links
 Rubin Dantschotter player info at the official Cercle Brugge site 
 Cerclemuseum.be 

Living people
1986 births
Belgian footballers
Belgian expatriate footballers
Cercle Brugge K.S.V. players
Association football goalkeepers
Footballers from Bruges
K.S.K. Beveren players
Belgian Pro League players
Challenger Pro League players
K.V. Oostende players
Sparta Rotterdam players
Eerste Divisie players
Expatriate footballers in the Netherlands